Paul Larose (born November 1, 1950) is a Canadian retired ice hockey forward who played 33 games in the World Hockey Association for the Quebec Nordiques and Michigan Stags/Baltimore Blades.

Career statistics

External links
 

1950 births
Living people
Baltimore Blades players
Canadian ice hockey forwards
French Quebecers
Sportspeople from Rouyn-Noranda
Maine Nordiques players
Michigan Stags players
Quebec Nordiques (WHA) players
Quebec Remparts players
Syracuse Blazers players
Toronto Maple Leafs draft picks
Trois-Rivières Ducs players
Ice hockey people from Quebec